Georges, Dominique, Jacques Guiraud (8 March 1868 – 11 March 1928) was a French organist, cellist and composer.

Career 
Born in Toulouse, Georges Guiraud first studied with the Jesuits and in 1898 won a first prize for cello at the Toulouse Conservatory where his father, Omer Guiraud, organist of Basilique Saint-Sernin de Toulouse teaches.

He entered the École Niedermeyer de Paris, then the Conservatoire de Paris. He followed the classes of Charles-Marie Widor, César Franck, and Jules Massenet. During this time in the capital, he was singing conductor at the concerts Colonne.

After his father's death, he returned to Toulouse in 1912, and took over from him at Saint-Sernin. He was then a professor of harmony at the Toulouse conservatory. Marcel Vidal-Saint-André dedicated his choral et mouvement vif to him and Émile Goué in 1923-24. Taking over from his father, he will also be a correspondent for  L'Express du Midi.

He was also a great friend of composer Aymé Kunc.

He died in toulouse on 11 March 1928.

Titulariats 
 From 1889 to 1895: Paris, Sainte-Croix and Saint-Jean
 From 1891 to 1912: Charenton-le-Pont, église paroissiale Saint-Pierre
 From 1912 to 1928: Toulouse, Basilique Saint-Sernin

Works 
1875: Fantaisie pour orgue
1877: L'organiste à Vêpres - 50 versets
1895: Sortie-Finale
1912: Offertoire pour les fêtes de la Sainte-Vierge
1914: Offertoire pascal sous forme de Variations sur l'O Filii
1926: Salut Solennel - Ave verum and Ave Regina Cælorum

But also masses, motets, melodies and piano pieces.

Bibliography 
 , Dictionnaire des organistes français des XIXe et XXe siècles, (p. 263)
 Louis Ollier, Georges Guiraud in Musique sacrée, Toulouse, 1928

References

External links 
 
 Georges Guiraud - Offertoire pour les Fêtes de la T.S. Vierge - David Boos, organ on YouTube

1868 births
1928 deaths
Musicians from Toulouse
French classical organists
French male organists
19th-century French composers
20th-century French composers
French composers of sacred music
French male composers
French Romantic composers
Conservatoire de Paris alumni
20th-century French male musicians
19th-century French male musicians
Male classical organists